The 1916 Nova Scotia general election was held on 20 June 1916 to elect members of the 36th House of Assembly of the Province of Nova Scotia, Canada. It was won by the Liberal party.

Results

Results by party

Retiring incumbents
Liberal
Charles P. Bissett, Richmond
Archibald M. Covert, Kings
Fullton Johnson Logan, Halifax
James MacDonald, Inverness
Smith Nickerson, Shelburne

Liberal-Conservative
Harry Hatheway Marshall, Digby
Norman Phinney, Annapolis

Nominated candidates
Legend
bold denotes party leader
† denotes an incumbent who is not running for re-election or was defeated in nomination contest

Valley

|-
|rowspan=2 bgcolor=whitesmoke|Annapolis
||
|Orlando Daniels2,14926.34%
|
|Obediah Parker Goucher2,02024.76%
|
|
|
|
||
|Orlando Daniels
|-
||
|Frank R. Elliott2,07725.46%
|
|Earle C. Phinney1,91223.44%
|
|
|
|
||
|Norman Phinney†
|-
|rowspan=2 bgcolor=whitesmoke|Digby
||
|Henry W.B. Warner1,90326.81%
|
|Felix M. Gaudet1,60422.59%
|
|
|
|
||
|Harry Hatheway Marshall†
|-
||
|Joseph William Comeau2,00228.20%
|
|Walton K. Tibert1,59022.40%
|
|
|
|
||
|Joseph William Comeau
|-
|rowspan=2 bgcolor=whitesmoke|Hants
|
|Burchill R. Fulmer1,92923.63%
||
|Albert Parsons2,14226.24%
|
|
|
|
||
|Albert Parsons
|-
||
|James William Reid2,05125.13%
|
|Herbert W. Sangster2,04125.00%
|
|
|
|
||
|James William Reid
|-
|rowspan=2 bgcolor=whitesmoke|Kings
|
|Charles Alexander Campbell2,31824.53%
||
|James E. Kinsman2,42125.62%
|
|
|
|
||
|Archibald M. Covert†
|-
||
|Harry H. Wickwire2,49926.44%
|
|Joseph D. Spidell2,21223.41%
|
|
|
|
||
|Harry H. Wickwire
|}

South Shore

|-
|rowspan=2 bgcolor=whitesmoke|Lunenburg
||
|John James Kinley2,99226.90%
|
|Alfred Clairmonte Zwicker2,08218.72%
|
|
|
|
||
|Alfred Clairmonte Zwicker
|-
|
|Oscar G. Donovan2,76824.88%
||
|Joseph Willis Margeson3,28229.50%
|
|
|
|
||
|Joseph Willis Margeson
|-
|rowspan=2 bgcolor=whitesmoke|Queens
|
|Frederick R. Freeman97723.33%
||
|William Lorimer Hall1,11626.65%
|
|
|
|
||
|William Lorimer Hall
|-
||
|Jordan W. Smith1,09826.22%
|
|D.C. Mulhall99723.81%
|
|
|
|
||
|Jordan W. Smith
|-
|rowspan=2 bgcolor=whitesmoke|Shelburne
||
|Robert Irwin1,44227.82%
|
|Wendell H. Currie1,20523.24%
|
|
|
|
||
|Robert Irwin
|-
||
|Maurice Nickerson1,42427.47%
|
|W.C. Hall1,11321.47%
|
|
|
|
||
|Smith Nickerson†
|-
|rowspan=2 bgcolor=whitesmoke|Yarmouth 
||
|Ernest Howard Armstrong1,93128.36%
|
|Joseph O. Difon1,30419.15%
|
|
|
|
||
|Ernest Howard Armstrong
|-
||
|Henry d'Entremont1,83927.00%
|
|Howard Corning1,73625.49%
|
|
|
|
||
|Howard Corning
|}

Fundy-Northeast

|-
|rowspan=2 bgcolor=whitesmoke|Colchester
|
|Gilbert H. Vernon2,21222.62%
||
|Robert H. Kennedy2,66527.25%
|
|
|
|
||
|Robert H. Kennedy
|-
|
|Frederick B. Schurman2,15822.07%
||
|Frank Stanfield2,74528.07%
|
|
|
|
||
|Frank Stanfield
|-
|rowspan=3 bgcolor=whitesmoke|Cumberland
||
|James Ralston3,95117.05%
|
|Daniel A. Morrison3,62015.62%
|
|James B. Nelson7273.14%
|
|
||
|James Ralston
|-
|
|Joshua H. Livingstone3,55415.33%
||
|James W. Kirkpatrick3,79116.36%
|
|
|
|
||
|New seat
|-
||
|Rufus Carter3,96217.09%
|
|J. Flemming Gilroy3,57215.41%
|
|
|
|
||
|Rufus Carter
|}

Halifax

|-
|rowspan=5 bgcolor=whitesmoke|Halifax
|
|John Brown Douglas6,3599.78%
||
|Hector MacInnes6,73510.36%
|
|
|
|
||
|New seat
|-
||
|John L. Connolly6,54510.06%
|
|John W. Regan6,3879.82%
|
|
|
|
||
|New seat
|-
||
|George Everett Faulkner6,60610.16%
|
|Felix P. Quinn6,3709.79%
|
|
|
|
||
|George Everett Faulkner
|-
||
|Henry Bauld6,85510.54%
|
|E.F. Williams6,2669.63%
|
|
|
|
||
|Fullton Johnson Logan†
|-
||
|Robert Emmett Finn6,70310.31%
|
|F.P. Bligh6,2139.55%
|
|
|
|
||
|Robert Emmett Finn
|}

Central Nova

|-
|rowspan=2 bgcolor=whitesmoke|Antigonish 
||
|Fred Robert Trotter1,30027.16%
|
|Allan MacDonald95319.91%
|
|
|
|
||
|Fred Robert Trotter
|-
||
|William Chisholm1,36628.54%
|
|John Stanfield O'Brien1,16724.38%
|
|
|
|
||
|John Stanfield O'Brien
|-
|rowspan=2 bgcolor=whitesmoke|Guysborough
||
|James F. Ellis1,75229.65%
|
|John Bell1,09318.50%
|
|
|
|
||
|James F. Ellis
|-
||
|James Cranswick Tory1,82730.92%
|
|Duncan S. Chisholm1,23620.92%
|
|
|
|
||
|James Cranswick Tory
|-
|rowspan=3 bgcolor=whitesmoke|Pictou
||
|Robert M. McGregor4,55517.68%
|
|John W. McKay4,21016.34%
|
|John B. Strickland4501.75%
|
|
||
|Robert M. McGregor
|-
||
|Robert Hugh MacKay4,30916.73%
|
|J. William Sutherland3,55713.81%
|
|
|
|
||
|Robert Hugh MacKay
|-
||
|Robert Henry Graham4,51217.52%
|
|Charles Elliott Tanner4,16516.17%
|
|
|
|
||
|Charles Elliott Tanner
|}

Cape Breton

|-
|rowspan=4 bgcolor=whitesmoke|Cape Breton
|
|D.J. Hartigan6,76412.11%
||
|Neil Ferguson6,88512.33%
|
|
|
|J. B. McLachlan (Socialist)1,0381.86%
||
|New seat
|-
|
|D.C. McDonald6,69211.98%
||
|Robert Hamilton Butts6,93512.42%
|
|
|
|
||
|Robert Hamilton Butts
|-
||
|Daniel Alexander Cameron7,03612.60%
|
|Finlay McDonald6,72112.04%
|
|
|
|
||
|New seat
|-
|
|Michael T. Sullivan6,39011.44%
||
|John Carey Douglas7,38113.22%
|
|
|
|
||
|John Carey Douglas
|-
|rowspan=2 bgcolor=whitesmoke|Inverness
||
|Donald MacLennan2,65526.65%
|
|Thomas Gallant2,53125.40%
|
|
|
|
||
|Donald MacLennan
|-
||
|John C. Bourinot2,54025.49%
|
|Duncan F. MacLean2,23822.46%
|
|
|
|
||
|James MacDonald†
|-
|rowspan=2 bgcolor=whitesmoke|Richmond
|
|Simon Joyce91819.60%
||
|Benjamin Amedeé LeBlanc1,38829.63%
|
|
|
|
||
|Simon Joyce
|-
|
|Alexander Finlayson99421.22%
||
|John Alexander MacDonald1,38429.55%
|
|
|
|
||
|Charles P. Bissett†
|-
|rowspan=2 bgcolor=whitesmoke|Victoria
||
|George Henry Murray1,21227.80%
|
|Joseph Hays88620.32%
|
|
|
|
||
|George Henry Murray
|-
||
|John Gillis Morrison1,18927.27%
|
|Phillip McLeod1,07324.61%
|
|
|
|
||
|Vacant
|}

References

Further reading
 

1916
1916 elections in Canada
1916 in Nova Scotia
June 1916 events